Walk the Plank may refer to:

 Walking the plank, a method of execution practiced by rogue seafarers
 Walk the Plank (game show), a South African television game show
 Walk the Plank (theatre company), an English pyrotechnics and theatre company
 Walk the Plank, a card game by Green Ronin Publishing

Music
 Walk the Plank (Pirates of the Mississippi album), 1991
 Walk The Plank (Zebrahead album), 2015
 "Walk the Plank", song on the 1982 album Arias & Symphonies by Spoon
 "Walk the Plank", a song from the 2003 film soundtrack album Pirates of the Caribbean: The Curse of the Black Pearl